Red sage may refer to:
 Salvia miltiorrhiza, a plant used in traditional Chinese Medicine
 Lantana camara, also known as Spanish Flag, a species of flowering plant
  Red Sage, a character in the Jak and Daxter video game series; see List of Jak and Daxter characters